Sebastian Thrun (born May 14, 1967) is a German-American entrepreneur, educator, and computer scientist. He is CEO of Kitty Hawk Corporation, and chairman and co-founder of Udacity. Before that, he was a Google VP and Fellow, a Professor of Computer Science at Stanford University, and before that at Carnegie Mellon University. At Google, he founded Google X and Google's self-driving car team. He is also an adjunct professor at Stanford University and at Georgia Tech.

Thrun led development of the robotic vehicle Stanley which won the 2005 DARPA Grand Challenge, and which has since been placed on exhibit in the Smithsonian Institution's National Museum of American History. His team also developed a vehicle called Junior, which placed second at the DARPA Grand Challenge in 2007. Thrun led the development of the Google self-driving car.

Thrun is also known for his work on probabilistic algorithms for robotics with applications including robotic mapping. In recognition of his contributions, and at the age of 39, he was elected into the National Academy of Engineering and also into the Academy of Sciences Leopoldina in 2007. The Guardian recognized him as one of 20 "fighters for internet freedom".

Early life and education
Thrun was born in 1967 in Solingen, Germany (former West Germany), the son of Winfried and Kristin (Grüner) Thrun. He completed his Vordiplom (intermediate examination) in computer science, economics, and medicine at the University of Hildesheim in 1988.  At the University of Bonn, he completed a Diplom (first degree) in 1993 and a Ph.D. (summa cum laude) in 1995 in computer science and statistics.

Career and research
In 1995 he joined the Computer Science Department at Carnegie Mellon University (CMU) as a research computer scientist. In 1998 he became an assistant professor and co-director of the Robot Learning Laboratory at CMU. As a faculty member at CMU, he co-founded the Master's Program in Automated Learning and Discovery, which later would become a Ph.D. program in the broad area of machine learning and scientific discovery. In 2001 Thrun spent a sabbatical year at Stanford University. He returned to CMU to an endowed professorship, the Finmeccanica Associate Professor of Computer Science and Robotics.

Thrun left CMU in July 2003 to become an associate professor at Stanford University and was appointed as the director of SAIL in January 2004. From 2007–2011, Thrun was a full professor of computer science and electrical engineering at Stanford. On April 1, 2011, Thrun relinquished his tenure at Stanford to join Google as a Google Fellow. On January 23, 2012, he co-founded an online private educational organization, Udacity. He was a Google VP and Fellow, and worked on development of the Google driverless car system. Thrun was interviewed in the 2018 documentary on artificial intelligence Do You Trust This Computer?.

Robotics
Thrun developed a number of autonomous robotic systems that earned him international recognition. In 1994, he started the University of Bonn's Rhino project together with his doctoral thesis advisor Armin B. Cremers. In 1997 Thrun and his colleagues Wolfram Burgard and Dieter Fox developed the world's first robotic tour guide in the Deutsches Museum Bonn (1997). In 1998, the follow-up robot "Minerva" was installed in the Smithsonian's National Museum of American History in Washington, DC, where it guided tens of thousands of visitors during a two-week deployment period. Thrun went on to found the CMU/Pitt Nursebot project, which fielded an interactive humanoid robot in a nursing home near Pittsburgh, Pennsylvania. In 2002, Thrun helped develop mine mapping robots in a project with his colleagues William L. Whittaker and Scott Thayer, research professors at Carnegie Mellon University. After his move to Stanford University in 2003, he engaged in the development of the robot Stanley, which in 2005 won the DARPA Grand Challenge. His former graduate student Michael Montemerlo, who was co-advised by William L. Whittaker, led the software development for this robot. In 2007, Thrun's robot "Junior" won second place in the 2007 DARPA Urban Challenge. Thrun joined Google as part of a sabbatical, together with several Stanford students. At Google, he co-developed Google Street View.

Thrun's best known contributions to robotics are on the theoretical end. He contributed to the area of probabilistic robotics, a field that marries statistics and robotics. He and his research group made substantial contributions in areas of mobile robot localization, mapping (SLAM), and control. Probabilistic techniques have since become mainstream in robotics, and are used in numerous commercial applications. In the fall of 2005, Thrun published a textbook entitled Probabilistic Robotics together with his long-term co-workers Dieter Fox and Wolfram Burgard. Since 2007, a Japanese translation of Probabilistic Robotics has been available on the Japanese market.

Thrun is one of the principal investors of the Stanford spin-off VectorMagic.

Awards

Named one of Brilliant 5 by Popular Science in 2005
CAREER award from the National Science Foundation, 1999—2003
Olympus award, German Society for Pattern Recognition, 2001
Fast Company: Fifth most creative person in 2011
4 on Foreign Policy magazine's Top 100 Global Thinkers of 2012
Max-Planck-Research Award, 2011
Inaugural AAAI Ed Feigenbaum Prize. Selected as the fifth most creative person in the business world by the Fast Company in 2011
Thrun was the 2012 recipient of Smithsonian magazine's American Ingenuity Award in the Education category.
Fellow of the European Association for Artificial Intelligence (EurAI)

References

External links

1967 births
Living people
Artificial intelligence researchers
German computer scientists
Machine learning researchers
German roboticists
People from Solingen
American investors
University of Bonn alumni
Stanford University School of Engineering faculty
West German expatriates in the United States
Carnegie Mellon University faculty
Google employees
Google Fellows
Fellows of the Association for the Advancement of Artificial Intelligence
Fellows of the European Association for Artificial Intelligence